This is a list of Italian football transfers for the January sale in 2008–09 season. Only moves from Serie A and Serie B are listed.

The winter transfer window was opened for four weeks, from 7 January. The window was closed at midnight on 2 February. Players without a club may join one, either during or in between transfer windows.

Players aged 16 and over from the European Union or aged 18 and over from outside the EU could be registered.

Winter transfer window

 Player officially joined his new club on 7 January 2009.
 Player officially joined his new club on 1 July 2009.

Out of window transfer

See also
List of Italian football transfers Summer 2007

References

 DEPOSITO CONTRATTI 08-09 Officially completed transfers from lega-calcio.it

Transfers Winter 2008-09
Italian
2008-09